Suat Zendeli (born 24 February 1981) is an Albanian Macedonian retired football player. He last played for FK Shkupi as a goalkeeper, where he was club captain in 2018. He retired in November 2018 and took a position with Shkupi's management team.

Club career
Zendeli won the championship in 2011 with Shkëndija and the cup in 2012 with FK Renova.

Zendeli played for Renova in the UEFA Europa League.

References

External links

1981 births
Living people
People from Jegunovce Municipality
Albanian footballers from North Macedonia
Association football goalkeepers
Macedonian footballers
FK Sloga Jugomagnat players
FK Dinamo Tirana players
KF Apolonia Fier players
Besa Kavajë players
KF Shkëndija players
FC Petrolul Ploiești players
FK Renova players
FK Shkupi players
Macedonian First Football League players
Kategoria Superiore players
Liga I players
Macedonian expatriate footballers
Expatriate footballers in Albania
Macedonian expatriate sportspeople in Albania
Expatriate footballers in Romania
Macedonian expatriate sportspeople in Romania